The 1981 UK Athletics Championships was the national championship in outdoor track and field for the United Kingdom held at Antrim Stadium, Antrim. It was the first time that a national track and field championship was held in Northern Ireland.

It was the fifth edition of the competition limited to British athletes only, launched as an alternative to the AAA Championships, which was open to foreign competitors. However, due to the fact that the calibre of national competition remained greater at the AAA event, the UK Championships this year were not considered the principal national championship event by some statisticians, such as the National Union of Track Statisticians (NUTS). Many of the athletes below also competed at the 1981 AAA Championships.

David Ottley won his fourth straight title in the men's javelin throw. Among the athletes to defend their 1980 UK titles were Cameron Sharp (men's 100 metres), Carol Tyson (race walk) and Louise Miller (high jump). Three athletes won UK title doubles, all of them women: Linsey MacDonald won the short sprint double, Gillian Dainty took both middle-distance titles, while Venissa Head was both shot put and discus throw champion.

The main international track and field competition for the United Kingdom that year was the 1981 European Cup. Reflecting the secondary status of the UK event at national level, none of the British individual medallists there were present at UK Championships, though all members of the medal-winning women's 4 × 400 metres relay reached the podium in Antrim (Linda Forsyth, Michelle Scutt, Verona Elder and Joslyn Hoyte-Smith).

Medal summary

Men

Women

References

UK Athletics Championships
UK Outdoor Championships
Athletics Outdoor
Sport in County Antrim
Athletics competitions in Northern Ireland